The Difference Engine (1990) is an alternative history novel by William Gibson and Bruce Sterling. It is widely regarded as a book that helped establish the genre conventions of steampunk.

It posits a Victorian era Britain in which great technological and social change has occurred after entrepreneurial inventor Charles Babbage succeeded in his ambition to build a mechanical computer (actually his Analytical Engine rather than the difference engine).

The novel was nominated for the British Science Fiction Award in 1990, the Nebula Award for Best Novel in 1991, and both the John W. Campbell Memorial Award and the Prix Aurora Award in 1992.

Setting
The novel is chiefly set in 1855. The fictional historical background diverges from our timeline around 1824, at which point Charles Babbage completes his Difference Engine and proceeds to develop an Analytical Engine. He becomes politically powerful and at the 1830 general election successfully opposes the Tory Government of the Duke of Wellington. Although Wellington stages a coup d'état in 1830 in an attempt to overturn his defeat and prevent the acceleration of technological change and social upheaval, he is assassinated in 1831. The Industrial Radical Party, led by a Lord Byron who survives the Greek War of Independence, comes to power. The Tory Party and hereditary peerage are eclipsed, and British trade unions assist in the ascendancy of the Industrial Radical Party (much as they aided the Labour Party of Great Britain in the twentieth century in our own world). As a result, Luddite anti-technological working class revolutionaries are ruthlessly suppressed.

By 1855, the Babbage computers have become mass-produced and ubiquitous, and their use emulates the innovations that actually occurred during our information technology and Internet revolutions. Other steam-powered technologies have also developed and so, for example, Gurney steam carriages become increasingly common. The novel explores the social consequences of an information technology revolution in the nineteenth century, such as the emergence of "clackers" (a reference to hackers), technologically-proficient people, such as Théophile Gautier, who are skilled at programming the Engines through the use of punched cards.

In the novel, the British Empire is more powerful than in our reality because of the development and the use of extremely-advanced steam-driven technology in industry. In addition, similar military technology has enhanced the capabilities of the armed forces (airships, dreadnoughts, and artillery) and the Babbage computers themselves. Under the Industrial Radical Party, Britain shows the utmost respect for leading scientific and industrial figures such as Isambard Kingdom Brunel and Charles Darwin. Indeed, they are collectively called "savants" and often raised to the peerage on their merits, causing a break with the past as regards social prestige and class distinction. The new patterns are also reflected in the educational sphere: classical studies have lost importance to more practical concerns such as engineering and accountancy.

Britain, rather than the United States, opened Japan to Western trade, in part because the United States became fragmented by interference from a Britain that foresaw the implications of a unified United States on the world stage. Counterpart successor states to our world's United States include a (truncated) United States; the Confederate States of America; the Republic of Texas; the Republic of California; a communist Manhattan Island commune (with Karl Marx as a leading light); British North America (analogous to Canada, albeit slightly larger in this world); and Russian America (Alaska). Napoleon III's French Empire holds an entente with the British, and Napoleon is even married to a British woman.

In the world of The Difference Engine, France occupies Mexico, as it did briefly in reality during the American Civil War. Like Great Britain, it has its own analytical/difference engines (ordinateurs), especially used in the context of domestic surveillance within its police force and intelligence agencies. As for the other world powers, Germany remains fragmented, with no suggestion that Prussia will eventually form the core of a unified nation, as it did in our own timeline in 1871, which may be caused by French sabotage analogous to that pursued in the case of the fragmentation of the United States noted above. Japan is awakening after the British ended its isolation, and looks, as in our timeline, set to become one of this world's leading industrial and economic powers from the 20th century onward.

The intervention of Lords Byron and Babbage provide famine relief with grain confiscated from the landed aristocracy. The Great Famine of Ireland never occurred, there is no agitation for Irish home rule or Irish independence and the Irish instead have become enthusiastic supporters of the Radical regime. A Spanish Civil War is mentioned to be taking place in 1855 with one side being the Royalists, and in 1905, possibly as a result of that conflict, there is an independent Republic of Catalonia.

Among other historical characters, the novel features "Texian" President Sam Houston, as an exile after a political coup in Texas, a reference to Percy Bysshe Shelley (as a Luddite), John Keats as a kinotropist (an operator of mechanical pixellated screens), and Benjamin Disraeli as a publicist and tabloid writer.

Plot summary
The action of the story follows Sybil Gerard, a political courtesan and daughter of an executed Luddite leader; Edward "Leviathan" Mallory, a paleontologist and explorer; and Laurence Oliphant, a historical figure who, as is portrayed in the book, was a travel writer whose work was a cover for espionage activities "undertaken in the service of Her Majesty".<ref>'"Secret Agent", Chap. 5, 'Laurence Oliphant, Anne Taylor, Oxford University Press, 1982</ref> Linking all their stories is the trail of a mysterious set of reportedly very powerful computer punch cards and the individuals fighting to obtain them.

Many characters come to believe that the punch cards are a gambling "modus", a programme that would allow the user to place consistently winning bets. The last chapter reveals that the punched cards represent a program that proves two theorems, which, in reality, would not be discovered until 1931 by Kurt Gödel. Ada Lovelace delivers a lecture on the subject in France.

Defending the cards, Mallory gathers his brothers and Ebenezer Fraser, a secret police officer, to fight the revolutionary Captain Swing, who leads a London riot during "the Stink", a major episode of pollution in which London swelters under an inversion layer (comparable to the London Smog of December 1952).

After the abortive uprising, Oliphant and Sybil Gerard meet at a cafe in Paris. Oliphant informs her that he is aware of her true identity but will not pursue it. However, he wants information that would compromise her seducer, Charles Egremont MP, now regarded as an obstacle to the strategies and political ambitions of Lords Brunel and Babbage. Sybil has longed for an opportunity for vengeance against Egremont, and the resultant political scandal destroys his parliamentary career and aspirations for a merit lordship. Oliphant also encounters a Manhattan-based group of feminist pantomime artists.

After several vignettes that elaborate on the alternate historical origins of the world of The Difference Engine, Lovelace delivers her lecture on Gödel's Theorem, as its counterpart is known in our world. She is chaperoned by Fraser and castigated by Sybil Gerard, who is still unable to forgive Ada's father, the late Lord Byron, for his role in her own father's death.

At the very end of the novel is a depiction of an alternate 1991 from the vantage point of a computer, which is revealed to be the narrator as it achieves self-awareness.

Characters
 The character Michael Godwin was named after attorney Mike Godwin to thank for his technical assistance in linking Sterling and Gibson's computers, which allowed them to collaborate between Austin and Vancouver.
 The characters of Sybil Gerard; her father, Walter Gerard; Charles Egremont; and Dandy Mick are all borrowed from Benjamin Disraeli's novel Sybil Literary criticism and significance 
The novel has attracted the attention of scholars, including Jay Clayton, who explores the book's attitude toward hacking, as well as its treatment of Babbage and Ada Lovelace; Herbert Sussman, who demonstrates how the book rewrites Benjamin Disraeli's novel Sybil; and Brian McHale, who relates it to the postmodern interest in finding a "new way of 'doing' history in fiction."

The novel was nominated for the British Science Fiction Award in 1990, the Nebula Award for Best Novel in 1991, and both the John W. Campbell Memorial Award and the Prix Aurora Award in 1992.

Influence
The 1993 video game The Chaos Engine (released as Soldiers of Fortune in the USA) was based on The Difference Engine''.

References

External links
 The Difference Dictionary, an indexed addendum of topics discussed in the novel, compiled by Eileen Gunn
 Editions of The Difference Engine at WorldCat.org
 The Difference Engine at Worlds Without End
 Review at Infinity-plus
"Gibson and Sterling's Alternative History: The Difference Engine as Radical Rewriting of Disraeli's Sybil"

1990 British novels
British alternative history novels
British steampunk novels
Charles Babbage
Collaborative novels
Novels set in London
Novels by Bruce Sterling
Novels by William Gibson
Fiction set in 1855
American Civil War alternate histories
Novels set in the 1850s
Victor Gollancz Ltd books